Jeffrey Friedman (March 25, 1959 – December 2, 2022) was an American political scientist and was the founder and editor of Critical Review: A Journal of Politics and Society.

Friedman majored in history and philosophy at Brown University. He received an MA in history at the University of California, Berkeley, in 1985 and a PhD in political science from Yale in 2002. He taught in the Government department at Dartmouth College in 1998, the Social Studies program at Harvard from 1998 to 2000, and the Political Science department at Barnard College, Columbia University from 2001 to 2006.

Friedman was a visiting scholar in the Charles and Louise Travers Department of Political Science University of California, Berkeley and the Max Weber Fellow of the Institute for the Advancement of the Social Sciences at Boston University.

Friedman died in Cambridge, Massachusetts, on December 2, 2022, at the age of 63.

Books
 The Rational-Choice Controversy: Economic Models of Politics Reconsidered (ed.) Yale University Press (1996).
 What Caused the Financial Crisis. (ed.) University of Pennsylvania Press (2010).
 Engineering the Financial Crisis: Systemic Risk and the Failure of Regulation w/ Wladimir Kraus – University of Pennsylvania Press (2011).
 Power Without Knowledge: A Critique of Technocracy. Oxford University Press (2019).

References

External links
 

1959 births
2022 deaths
20th-century American non-fiction writers
21st-century American non-fiction writers
American political scientists
American political writers
Brown University alumni
Harvard University faculty
UC Berkeley College of Letters and Science alumni
Yale Graduate School of Arts and Sciences alumni
20th-century American male writers
American male non-fiction writers
21st-century American male writers